Sandhult is a locality situated in Borås Municipality, Västra Götaland County, Sweden. It had 608 inhabitants in 2010.

Notable people

Notable people from Sandhult include:

 Carolina Klüft
 Mia Mulder

References 

Populated places in Västra Götaland County
Populated places in Borås Municipality